The arrondissement of Caen is an arrondissement of France in the Calvados department in the Normandy region. It has 201 communes.

Composition

The communes of the arrondissement of Caen, and their INSEE codes, are:

 Amayé-sur-Orne (14006)
 Anisy (14015)
 Argences (14020)
 Aubigny (14025)
 Authie (14030)
 Avenay (14034)
 Banneville-la-Campagne (14036)
 Barbery (14039)
 Baron-sur-Odon (14042)
 Barou-en-Auge (14043)
 Basly (14044)
 Beaumais (14053)
 Bellengreville (14057)
 Bénouville (14060)
 Bernières-d'Ailly (14064)
 Bernières-sur-Mer (14066)
 Biéville-Beuville (14068)
 Blainville-sur-Orne (14076)
 Le Bô (14080)
 Bonnœil (14087)
 Bons-Tassilly (14088)
 Bougy (14089)
 Boulon (14090)
 Bourguébus (14092)
 Bretteville-le-Rabet (14097)
 Bretteville-sur-Laize (14100)
 Bretteville-sur-Odon (14101)
 Le Bû-sur-Rouvres (14116)
 Caen (14118)
 Cagny (14119)
 La Caine (14122)
 Cairon (14123)
 Cambes-en-Plaine (14125)
 Canteloup (14134)
 Carpiquet (14137)
 Le Castelet (14554)
 Castine-en-Plaine (14538)
 Cauvicourt (14145)
 Cauville (14146)
 Cesny-aux-Vignes (14149)
 Cesny-les-Sources (14150)
 Cintheaux (14160)
 Clécy (14162)
 Cléville (14163)
 Colleville-Montgomery (14166)
 Colombelles (14167)
 Colomby-Anguerny (14014)
 Combray (14171)
 Condé-sur-Ifs (14173)
 Cordey (14180)
 Cormelles-le-Royal (14181)
 Cossesseville (14183)
 Courcy (14190)
 Courseulles-sur-Mer (14191)
 Cresserons (14197)
 Crocy (14206)
 Croisilles (14207)
 Culey-le-Patry (14211)
 Cuverville (14215)
 Damblainville (14216)
 Démouville (14221)
 Le Détroit (14223)
 Donnay (14226)
 Douvres-la-Délivrande (14228)
 Émiéville (14237)
 Épaney (14240)
 Épron (14242)
 Eraines (14244)
 Ernes (14245)
 Espins (14248)
 Esquay-Notre-Dame (14249)
 Esson (14251)
 Estrées-la-Campagne (14252)
 Éterville (14254)
 Évrecy (14257)
 Falaise (14258)
 Feuguerolles-Bully (14266)
 Fleury-sur-Orne (14271)
 Fontaine-Étoupefour (14274)
 Fontaine-le-Pin (14276)
 Fontenay-le-Marmion (14277)
 Fourches (14283)
 Fourneaux-le-Val (14284)
 Frénouville (14287)
 Le Fresne-Camilly (14288)
 Fresné-la-Mère (14289)
 Fresney-le-Puceux (14290)
 Fresney-le-Vieux (14291)
 Gavrus (14297)
 Giberville (14301)
 Gouvix (14309)
 Grainville-Langannerie (14310)
 Grainville-sur-Odon (14311)
 Grentheville (14319)
 Grimbosq (14320)
 Hermanville-sur-Mer (14325)
 Hérouville-Saint-Clair (14327)
 La Hoguette (14332)
 Ifs (14341)
 Les Isles-Bardel (14343)
 Janville (14344)
 Jort (14345)
 Laize-Clinchamps (14349)
 Langrune-sur-Mer (14354)
 Leffard (14360)
 Lion-sur-Mer (14365)
 Les Loges-Saulces (14375)
 Louvagny (14381)
 Louvigny (14383)
 Luc-sur-Mer (14384)
 Maizet (14393)
 Maizières (14394)
 Maltot (14396)
 Le Marais-la-Chapelle (14402)
 Martainville (14404)
 Martigny-sur-l'Ante (14405)
 Mathieu (14407)
 May-sur-Orne (14408)
 Meslay (14411)
 Le Mesnil-Villement (14427)
 Mondeville (14437)
 Mondrainville (14438)
 Montigny (14446)
 Montillières-sur-Orne (14713)
 Morteaux-Coulibœuf (14452)
 Mouen (14454)
 Moulines (14455)
 Moult-Chicheboville (14456)
 Les Moutiers-en-Auge (14457)
 Les Moutiers-en-Cinglais (14458)
 Mutrécy (14461)
 Noron-l'Abbaye (14467)
 Norrey-en-Auge (14469)
 Olendon (14476)
 Ouézy (14482)
 Ouffières (14483)
 Ouilly-le-Tesson (14486)
 Ouistreham (14488)
 Périers-sur-le-Dan (14495)
 Perrières (14497)
 Pertheville-Ners (14498)
 Pierrefitte-en-Cinglais (14501)
 Pierrepont (14502)
 Plumetot (14509)
 La Pommeraye (14510)
 Pont-d'Ouilly (14764)
 Potigny (14516)
 Préaux-Bocage (14519)
 Rapilly (14531)
 Reviers (14535)
 Rosel (14542)
 Rots (14543)
 Rouvres (14546)
 Saint-André-sur-Orne (14556)
 Saint-Aubin-d'Arquenay (14558)
 Saint-Aubin-sur-Mer (14562)
 Saint-Contest (14566)
 Sainte-Honorine-du-Fay (14592)
 Saint-Germain-la-Blanche-Herbe (14587)
 Saint-Germain-Langot (14588)
 Saint-Germain-le-Vasson (14589)
 Saint-Lambert (14602)
 Saint-Laurent-de-Condel (14603)
 Saint-Manvieu-Norrey (14610)
 Saint-Martin-de-Fontenay (14623)
 Saint-Martin-de-Mieux (14627)
 Saint-Omer (14635)
 Saint-Ouen-du-Mesnil-Oger (14637)
 Saint-Pair (14640)
 Saint-Pierre-Canivet (14646)
 Saint-Pierre-du-Bû (14649)
 Saint-Pierre-du-Jonquet (14651)
 Saint-Rémy (14656)
 Saint-Sylvain (14659)
 Sannerville (14666)
 Sassy (14669)
 Soignolles (14674)
 Soliers (14675)
 Soulangy (14677)
 Soumont-Saint-Quentin (14678)
 Thaon (14685)
 Thue et Mue (14098)
 Thury-Harcourt-le-Hom (14689)
 Tourville-sur-Odon (14707)
 Tréprel (14710)
 Troarn (14712)
 Urville (14719)
 Ussy (14720)
 Vacognes-Neuilly (14721)
 Valambray (14005)
 Vendeuvre (14735)
 Versainville (14737)
 Verson (14738)
 Le Vey (14741)
 Vicques (14742)
 Vieux (14747)
 Vignats (14751)
 Villers-Canivet (14753)
 Villons-les-Buissons (14758)
 Villy-lez-Falaise (14759)
 Vimont (14761)

History

The arrondissement of Caen was created in 1800. At the January 2017 reorganisation of the arrondissements of Calvados, it lost 19 communes to the arrondissement of Bayeux, 20 communes to the arrondissement of Vire and 15 communes to the arrondissement of Lisieux.

As a result of the reorganisation of the cantons of France which came into effect in 2015, the borders of the cantons are no longer related to the borders of the arrondissements. The cantons of the arrondissement of Caen were, as of January 2015:

 Bourguébus
 Bretteville-sur-Laize
 Cabourg
 Caen-1
 Caen-2
 Caen-3
 Caen-4
 Caen-7
 Caen-8
 Caen-9
 Caen-10
 Caen-Hérouville (Caen-6)
 Creully
 Douvres-la-Délivrande
 Évrecy
 Falaise-Nord
 Falaise-Sud
 Hérouville-Saint-Clair (Caen-5)
 Morteaux-Couliboeuf
 Ouistreham
 Thury-Harcourt
 Tilly-sur-Seulles
 Troarn
 Villers-Bocage

References

Caen
Caen